Washington Township is one of thirteen townships in Washington County, Indiana, United States. As of the 2010 census, its population was 10,176 and it contained 4,543 housing units.

Geography

Cities, towns, villages
 Salem (the county seat)

Unincorporated towns
 Canton at 
 Fair Acres at 
 Harristown at 
 Highland at 
 Hitchcock at 
 Martin Heights at 
 McCol Place at 
(This list is based on USGS data and may include former settlements.)

Adjacent townships
 Monroe Township (north)
 Gibson Township (northeast)
 Franklin Township (east)
 Polk Township (southeast)
 Pierce Township (south)
 Howard Township (southwest)
 Vernon Township (west)
 Jefferson Township (northwest)

Cemeteries
The township contains these thirteen cemeteries: Blue River Hicksite, Blue River Quaker Orthodox, Coggswell, McKnight, New Philadelphia, Nicholson, Norris, Old Hebron, Paynter, Poor Farm, Stalker, Winslow and Wright.

Airports and landing strips
 Hardin Airport
 Salem Municipal Airport

Education
 Salem Community Schools

Washington Township is served by the Salem-Washington Township Public Library.

Political districts
 Indiana's 9th congressional district
 State House District 73
 State Senate District 44

References
 United States Census Bureau 2007 TIGER/Line Shapefiles
 United States Board on Geographic Names (GNIS)
 IndianaMap

External links
 Indiana Township Association
 United Township Association of Indiana

Townships in Washington County, Indiana
Townships in Indiana